WWE Hall of Fame (2005) was the event which featured introduction of the 6th class to the WWE Hall of Fame. The event was produced by World Wrestling Entertainment (WWE) on April 2, 2005, from the Universal Amphitheatre in Los Angeles, California. The event took place the same weekend as WrestleMania 21. The event was hosted by Gene Okerlund. A condensed version of the ceremony aired that evening on Spike TV. In March 2015 the ceremony was added to the WWE Network.

Aftermath
On July 24, 2015, WWE terminated their contract with Hulk Hogan, stating that they are "committed to embracing and celebrating individuals from all backgrounds", although Hogan's lawyer said Hogan chose to resign. A day prior, WWE removed virtually all references to Hogan from their website, including his entry from its WWE Hall of Fame page. The termination coincided with the publication by the National Enquirer and Radar Online of an anti-black rant made by Hogan on his controversial leaked sex tape in which he is heard expressing disgust with the notion of his daughter with any black man, referenced by repeated use of the racial slur "nigger". Hogan also admitted to being "a racist, to a point". However, no official statement about his removal had been made and he was still listed in the Hall of Fame entry of the official WWE encyclopedia released in October 2016.

On July 15, 2018, despite no prior official statements by the WWE declaring his removal from the Hall of Fame, Hogan was reinstated into the Hall of Fame, after his numerous public apologies over the past year, as well as volunteering work.

Inductees

Individual
 Class headliners appear in boldface

References

WWE Hall of Fame ceremonies
2005 in professional wrestling
Professional wrestling in Los Angeles
Events in Los Angeles
2005 in Los Angeles
April 2005 events in the United States